The Japan Public Sector Union (JPSU; , Kokko Rengo) is a trade union representing public sector workers in Japan.

History
The union was established in October 2001, bringing together several affiliates, including the Japan Central Federation of National Public Service Employees' Unions (Kokko Soren).  In 2011, Kokko Soren dissolved, and its own affiliates then became direct members of Kokko Rengo.  Its largest current affiliates are:

 All Hokkaido Development Bureau Employees' Union
 All Japan Finance Bureau Labour Union
 All Japan Garrison Forces Labor Union
 Federation of Japanese Customs Personnel Labour Unions
 Japan Agriculture and Forestry Ministry Workers' Unions
 Japanese Confederation of National Tax Unions
 Labor Federation of Government Related Organizations
 Okinawa Public Service Workers' Union

Like all its predecessors, the union became affiliated with the Japanese Trade Union Confederation.  In 2004, it created the National Public Union as a new affiliate, which accepts members from any area of the public sector not covered by its other affiliates.  Its membership was 110,766 in 2009, but had fallen to 79,621 by 2020.

External links

References

Public sector trade unions
Trade unions established in 2001
Trade unions in Japan